Muhammad Zainal Haq (born 5 April 1992) is an Indonesian professional footballer who plays as a defender for Liga 2 club Putra Delta Sidoarjo.

Club career

Early career
In January 2011, Zainal Haq joined Peñarol. Besides Zainal, the Uruguayan club signed two other Indonesian players, Manahati Lestusen and Abdul Lestaluhu. Demis Djamaoeddin (Deportivo Indonesia manager) said "They are already there and introduced to the public".

C.S. Visé
In April 2011, Zainal joined Belgian club C.S. Visé as part of the Bakrie Group project with Deportivo Indonesia.

Persebaya Bhayangkara
Zainal Haq joined Persebaya (Bhayangkara) and played at the 2014 Inter Island Cup.

International career
In 2007, Zainal represented the Indonesia U-16 team in the 2008 AFC U-16 Championship qualification phase.

References

External links
 

1992 births
Badak Lampung F.C. players
Indonesian footballers
Expatriate footballers in Belgium
Indonesian expatriate footballers
C.S. Visé players
Persebaya Surabaya players
Persela Lamongan players
Liga 1 (Indonesia) players
People from Sidoarjo Regency
Sportspeople from East Java
Association football defenders
Living people